Irthlingborough Town F.C. was an English association football club which participated in the United Counties League and the FA Cup.

References

Defunct football clubs in England
Defunct football clubs in Northamptonshire